Coronta "Tay" Cody (born October 6, 1977) is a former American college and professional football who was a defensive back in the National Football League (NFL) and Canadian Football League (CFL) for six seasons.  He played college football for Florida State University, and was a consensus All-American.  He was picked by the San Diego Chargers in the third round of the 2001 NFL Draft, and he also played professionally for the Edmonton Eskimos and Hamilton Tiger-Cats of the CFL.

Early years
Cody was born in Colquitt, Georgia.  He attended Early County High School in Blakely, Georgia, and he played for the Early County high school football team.  He was listed among the Atlanta Journal-Constitution's "Super Southern 100" as a senior defensive back.  He was regarded as one of Georgia's top 50 prospects and received one of the higher grades from Jeff Whitaker's Deep South Football.  He was considered the 12th-best defensive back in the country by Super Prep.  He recorded 10 interceptions over his final two seasons.  He totaled 70 tackles as a senior.

College career
Cody attended Florida State University, and played for coach Bobby Bowden's Florida State Seminoles football team from 1996 to 2000.  He was redshirted as a true freshman in 1996.  He appeared in seven of the Seminoles' 11 games during their BCS National Championship season in 1999, and earned honorable mention All-Atlantic Coast Conference honors.  As a senior in 2000, he was a first-team All-ACC selection and was recognized as a consensus first-team All-American as a defensive back.

Professional career
The San Diego Chargers selected Cody in the third round (67th overall pick) of the 2001 NFL Draft. He played three seasons for the Chargers (2001–2003). He joined the CFL's Edmonton Eskimos for one season (2005). He finished his career with the Hamilton Tiger-Cats (2006–2008).

Cody coached football at Bay High School in Panama City, Florida until 2012. He was the defensive coordinator and defensive-backs coach.

References

1977 births
Living people
All-American college football players
American football cornerbacks
American players of Canadian football
Canadian football defensive backs
Edmonton Elks players
Florida State Seminoles football players
Hamilton Tiger-Cats players
People from Colquitt, Georgia
Players of American football from Georgia (U.S. state)
San Diego Chargers players
People from Blakely, Georgia